Shiroor is a village in Byndoor Taluk in the state of Karnataka, India. Mudramakki, Tuddalli, Keserkodi , Kodmakki and Neerugadde are localities within Shiroor. It is home to the Zamaithi,Nawaithi, Nakhuda, Kannada, Urdu & Konkani.Zamaithi & Nakhuda are languages commonly spoken in the area. Muslim mohalla is the biggest area with nawayathi & zamaithi communities.

Transport 
Shiroor is connected to other cities and states in India by roads and railways. National Highway 66 (India) crosses the village, which had a major impact on its development. Under the Konkan Railway, many trains run day and night to and from the town. Shiroor is linked to the Indian railway system by Shiroor railway station.

Culture 
The residents celebrate festivals such as Eid ul Fitr, Ramadan, Eid al azha, Muharram, Milad un nabi, Makara Sankranti, Nagara Panchami, Krishna Janmashtami, Ganesh Chaturthi, Navaratri, Deepavali. Folk arts like Yakshagana are also popular.

Schools and colleges  
1) Green Valley International School.

2) Touheed Urdu & English Medium School.

3) Higher Primary Govt School & College. (Market)

4) Siraate Mustaqeem.

5) Knowledge Primary School.

6) Hindustani Primary School.

7) Gousiya Anjuman.

References 

Villages in Udupi district